The 2016 Vale by-election was held in the States of Guernsey district of Vale on 19 October 2016 following the death of deputy Dave Jones in July 2016. Nominations closed on 23 September. Neil Inder was elected as the new deputy.

Result

References

By-elections in Guernsey
Vale by-election
Vale by-election
Vale by-election